Arash Bayat (born July 19, 1983) is a former Iranian-Swedish footballer, Arash was voted the best middle eastern player of Sweden in 4 different time: 2001, 2002, 2003, 2005.

Career 
Bayat has made an impressive career in Swedish second tier football with Västra Frölunda IF and GIF Sundsvall. GIF took the step up to the Swedish top flight, Allsvenskan at the end of the 2007 season. On August 17, 2008 it was announced that Bayat would join IFK Mariehamn for the remainder of the 2008 season on a loan. In December 2010 resigned his contract with Superettan club Ljungskile SK and joined as player to Assyriska BK.

Attributes
He usually plays as a midfielder but can also play as a striker if required.

International career 
Bayat played from 1999 to 2001, 37 games and scored sixteen goals for the Swedish U-16 and U-18 national football team.

Language
Persian is his official but he learned Swedish after he moved to Sweden.

Private life
He holds Swedish and Iranian citizenships.

Early life
He was born in Tehran but moved to Sweden with his family at an early age.

Career statistics

Notes

1983 births
Living people
Swedish footballers
Iranian footballers
Iranian expatriate footballers
Sportspeople of Iranian descent
Allsvenskan players
Superettan players
Veikkausliiga players
Ettan Fotboll players
Division 3 (Swedish football) players
Västra Frölunda IF players
GIF Sundsvall players
IFK Mariehamn players
Qviding FIF players
Ljungskile SK players
Expatriate footballers in Finland
Iranian expatriate sportspeople in Sweden
Iranian emigrants to Sweden
Sweden youth international footballers
Association football midfielders